Uvalde Lindsey (born January 17, 1940) is an American politician and a former Democratic member of the Arkansas Senate representing District 4 from January 14, 2013, until January 14, 2019. Lindsey served consecutively in the Arkansas General Assembly from January 2009 until January 2013 in the Arkansas House of Representatives District 88 seat.

Education
Lindsey earned his BSBA from the University of Arkansas.

Elections
2012 With Senate District 4 Senator Sharon Trusty retired and left the seat open, Lindsey was unopposed for both the May 22, 2012 Democratic Primary and the November 6, 2012 General election.
2008 Initially in House District 88, when Representative Marilyn Edwards left the Legislature and left the seat open, Lindsey was unopposed for both the May 20, 2008 Democratic Primary and the November 4, 2008 General election.
2010 Lindsey was unopposed for both the May 18, 2010 Democratic Primary and the November 2, 2010 General election.

References

External links
Official page at the Arkansas General Assembly
Campaign site

Uvalde Lindsey at Ballotpedia
Uvalde Lindsey at the National Institute on Money in State Politics

1940 births
Living people
Democratic Party Arkansas state senators
Democratic Party members of the Arkansas House of Representatives
People from Harrison, Arkansas
United States Army officers
University of Arkansas alumni
21st-century American politicians